Shiremoor is a Tyne and Wear Metro station, serving the village of Shiremoor, North Tyneside in Tyne and Wear, England. It joined the network on 11 August 1980, following the opening of the first phase of the network, between Haymarket and Tynemouth via Four Lane Ends.

History
Unlike neighbouring West Monkseaton, a converted British Rail station, Shiremoor was purpose-built for the Tyne and Wear Metro network in the late 1970s. The station opened as a replacement for the former Backworth station, which closed to passengers in June 1977.

Facilities 
Step-free access is available at all stations across the Tyne and Wear Metro network, with ramped access to both platforms. The station is equipped with ticket machines, waiting shelter, seating, next train information displays, timetable posters, and an emergency help point on both platforms. Ticket machines are able to accept payment with credit and debit card (including contactless payment), notes and coins. The station is also fitted with smartcard validators, which feature at all stations across the network.

There is a small free car park available at the station, with 20 spaces. There is also the provision for cycle parking, with four cycle pods available for use.

Services 
, the station is served by up to five trains per hour on weekdays and Saturday, and up to four trains per hour during the evening and on Sunday.

Rolling stock used: Class 599 Metrocar

References

External links
 
 Timetable and station information for Shiremoor

Metropolitan Borough of North Tyneside
1980 establishments in England
Railway stations in Great Britain opened in 1980
Tyne and Wear Metro Yellow line stations
Transport in Tyne and Wear
